is a Japanese footballer currently playing as a left-back for Júbilo Iwata.

Club career
Kato made his professional debut for Júbilo Iwata in a 2–0 Emperor's Cup win against Oita Trinita.

Career statistics

Club

Notes

References

External links

1996 births
Living people
Association football people from Saitama Prefecture
Senshu University alumni
Japanese footballers
Association football defenders
Urawa Red Diamonds players
AC Kajaani players
Júbilo Iwata players
Japanese expatriate footballers
Japanese expatriate sportspeople in Australia
Expatriate soccer players in Australia
Japanese expatriate sportspeople in Finland
Expatriate footballers in Finland